In the 1988–89 season, USM Alger is competing in the National for the 18th time, as well as the Algerian Cup.  It is their 2nd consecutive season in the top flight of Algerian football. They will be competing in National 1 and the Algerian Cup.

Squad list
Players and squad numbers last updated on 1 September 1988.Note: Flags indicate national team as has been defined under FIFA eligibility rules. Players may hold more than one non-FIFA nationality.

Competitions

Overview

Championnat National

League table

Results by round

Matches

Algerian Cup

African Cup Winners' Cup

First round

Second round

Squad information

Playing statistics

|-

|-
! colspan=12 style=background:#dcdcdc; text-align:center| Players transferred out during the season

Goalscorers
Includes all competitive matches. The list is sorted alphabetically by surname when total goals are equal.

References

USM Alger seasons
Algerian football clubs 1988–89 season